KK Korab is a basketball club from Skopje, North Macedonia. The team is currently owned by KORAB PRIVATE UNIVERSITY and coached by Igor Gacov.

History
KK Korab  was formed in the year 2010 in the city of Skopje by the Private Korab University.

Rivalries
Feni Industries
Pelister

Management

Team president
 Sensun Amits (2009–present)

Ownership history
KORAB PRIVATE UNIVERSITY (2009–present)

General manager
 Емил Рајковиќ (2009–present)

Medical staff

Team physician
 Dr.Горан Андонов (2009–present)

Team trainer
 Николица Цекиќ (2009–present)

Basketball teams in North Macedonia